Llan and its variants (Irish and ) are a common element of Celtic placenames in the British Isles and Brittany, especially of Welsh toponymy. Goidelic toponyms end in -lann.

The various forms of the word are distantly cognate with English land and lawn and presumably initially denoted a specially cleared and enclosed area of land. In late antiquity it came to be applied particularly to the sanctified land occupied by communities of Christian converts. It is part of the name of more than 630 locations in Wales and nearly all have some connection with a local patron saint. These were usually the founding saints of the parish, relatives of the ruling families who invaded Wales during the early Middle Ages. The founder of a new llan was obliged to reside at the site and to eat only once a day, each time taking a bit of bread and an egg and drinking only water and milk. This lasted for forty days, Sundays excepted, after which the land was considered sanctified for ever. The typical llan employed or erected a circular or oval embankment with a protective stockade, surrounded by wooden or stone huts. Unlike Saxon practice, these establishments were not chapels for the local lords but almost separate tribes, initially some distance away from the secular community. Over time, however, it became common for prosperous communities to become either monasteries forbidden to lay residents or fully secular communities controlled by the local lord.

In the later Middle Ages llan also came to denote entire parishes, both as an ecclesiastical region and as a subdivision of a commote or hundred.

Place names in Wales

Places named after saints

Llanaelhaearn, Saint Aelhaiarn
Llanafan Fawr 'Great Llanafan',  Saint Afan
Llanafan Fechan 'Little Llanafan' (now often 'Llanfechan'), Saint Afan
Llanafan y Trawsgoed (alternatively, Llanafan, Ceredigion), Saint Afan
Llanallgo, Saint Gallgo see St Gallgo's Church
Llanarmon, Gwynedd, Saint Garmon
Llanarmon Dyffryn Ceiriog, Saint Garmon
Llanarmon Mynydd Mawr, Saint Garmon
Llanarmon-yn-Iâl, Denbighshire, Saint Garmon or St. Germanus of Auxerre
Llanarthney, St Arthney
Llanasa, Saint Asaph
Llanbabo, Saint Pabo
Llanbadarn Fawr, Ceredigion, Saint Padarn 
Llanbadarn Fawr, Powys St Padarn
Llanbadarn Fynydd, Saint Padarn
Llanbadarn y Garreg, Saint Padarn
Llanbadoc, Saint Madoc see St Madoc's Church, Llanbadoc
Llanbadrig, Saint Patrick
Llanbeder, Newport St Peter
Llanbedr, Saint Peter
Llanbedr, Crickhowell St Peter
Llanbedr (Radnorshire), Saint Peter
Llanbedr Dyffryn Clwyd, Saint Peter
Llanbedrgoch, Saint Peter
Llanbedrog, Saint Petroc
Llanbedr-y-cennin, Saint Peter
Llanbedr Pont Steffan, St Peter
Llanbeulan, Saint Peulan
Llanberis, Saint Peris
Llanblethian, Saint Bleiddian
Llanbrynmair, Saint Mary
Llandanwg, Saint Tanwg
Llandecwyn, Saint Tecwyn
Llandefaelog Fach, Powys, St Maelog
Llandegveth, St Tegvedd
Llanddeiniol, St Deiniol
Llanddeiniolen, Saint Deiniol
Llandderfel, Saint Derfel
Llanddeusant, Anglesey, two saints: Saint Marcellus and Saint Marcellina
Llanddeusant, Carmarthenshire, two saints: Saint David and Saint Teilo
Llanddew, St David
Llanddewi Nant Honddu (Llanthony), St David
Llandegfan Saint Tegfan
Llandegla, Saint Tegla
Llandegley, Saint Tegla
Llandeilo, Saint Teilo
Llandeilo'r-Fan Saint Teilo
Llanddaniel Fab Saint Deiniol Fab see St Deiniol's Church, Llanddaniel Fab
Llanddewi, St David
Llanddewi Brefi, Saint David
Llanddewi'r Cwm, St David
Llanddewi Rhydderch, St David
Llanddewi Velfrey, St David
Llanddewi Ystradenny, St David
Llanddoged, Saint Doged
Llanddona, Saint Dona see St Dona's Church, Llanddona
Llanddwywe, Saint Dwywe
Llanddyfnan, Saint Dyfnan
Llandetty, Saint Detyw and Saint Tetta
Llandissilio, Saint Tysilio
Llandogo, in Welsh Llaneuddogwy, St Euddogwy (Oudoceus)
Llandough, Llanfair, Saint Dochau/Dochdwy
Llandough, Penarth, Saint Dochau/Dochdwy
Llandrillo, Denbighshire, Saint Trillo
Llandrillo yn Rhos, Saint Trillo
Llandrinio, Saint Trunio
Llandudoch, Saint Dogmael
Llandudno, Saint Tudno
Llandwrog, Saint Twrog
Llandybie, Saint Tybie
Llandyfaelog, St Maelog
Llandyfan, St Dyfan
Llandyfriog, Saint Brioc
Llandyfrydog, Saint Tyfrydog see  St Tyfrydog's Church, Llandyfrydog
Llandygai, Saint Tegai
Llandyrnog, Saint Tyrnog
Llandysilio, Saint Tysilio
Llandyssil, Saint Tysul
Llandysul, Saint Tysul
Llanelieu, St Ellyw see St Ellyw's Church, Llanelieu
Llanelltyd, Saint Illtud
Llanenddwyn, Saint Enddwyn
Llanfaelog, Saint Maelog
Llanfaelrhys, Saint Maelrhys
Llanfaethlu, Saint Maethlu see  St Maethlu's Church, Llanfaethlu
Llanfairfechan `Little Saint Marys Parish`
Llanfaglan, Saint Baglan
Llanfallteg, Llanfallteg West, St Mallteg
Llanfechell, Saint Mechell
Llanfflewyn Saint Fflewin See St Fflewin's Church, Llanfflewin
Llanfigael, Saint Figael see St Figael's Church, Llanfigael
Llanfoist, St Ffwyst
Llanfwrog, Anglesey Saint Mwrog
Llanfwrog, Denbighshire Saint Mwrog
Llanedi, Saint Edith
Llanedeyrn, Saint Edeyrn
Llanedwen, St. Edwen see St Edwen's Church, Llanedwen
Llanengan Einion Frenin, also known as Engan
Llannefydd, Saint Nefydd
Llanegryn, Saint Egryn
Llanegwad, Saint Egwad
Llaneilian, Saint Eilian
Llanelian-yn-rhos, a former civil parish in Conwy County Borough, Saint Elian (Wales)
Llanelidan, Saint Elidan see St Elidan's Church, Llanelidan
Llanellen, Saint Elen, often anglicised as St Helen
Llanelli, Saint Elli
Llanelly, St Elli
Llanelwedd, Saint Elwedd
Llanelwy, Saint Asaph
Llanenddwyn, Saint Enddwyn
Llanerfyl, Saint Erfyl
Llaneuddog, Saint Euddog
Llanfair, Gwynedd, St Mary
Llanfair Caereinion, St Mary
Llanfair Clydogau, St Mary
Llanfair Dyffryn Clwyd, Saint Mary
Llanfair-Nant-Gwyn St Mary
Llanfairpwllgwyngyllgogerychwyrndrobwllllantysiliogogogoch, Saint Mary and Saint Tysilio
Llanfair Talhaiarn St Mary, Saint Alhaiarn(?)
Llanfair-yng-Nghornwy Saint Mary
Llanfechan or Llanafan Fechan, Saint Afan
Llanferres, Saint Berres (Brice of Tours) see St Berres' Church, Llanferres
Llanfihangel-ar-Arth, Saint Michael, the Archangel 
Llanvihangel Crucorney, St Michael, the Archangel 
Llanfihangel Glyn Myfyr, the Archangel, Michael (Mihangel)
Llanfihangel Rhydithon, St Michael, the Archangel 
Llanfihangel Nant Brân, St Michael, the Archangel 
Llanfihangel Nant Melan, St Michael, the Archangel 
Llanfihangel Rogiet, see St Michael and All Angels Church, Llanfihangel Rogiet 
Llanfihangel-uwch-Gwili, St Michael, the Archangel 
Llanfihangel Talyllyn, St Michael (Mihangel) and All Angels
Llanfihangel y Creuddyn, St Michael (archangel)
Llanfihangel-yng-Ngwynfa, St Michael, the Archangel 
Llanfihangel-y-Pennant , St Michael, the Archangel 
Llanfihangel-y-Pennant, Dolbenmaen, St Michael, the Archangel 
Llanfihangel Ysgeifiog, St Michael and All Angels
Llanfihangel-y-Traethau, Saint Michael, the Archangel
Llanfihangel yn Nhowyn, St Michael, (Mihangel) the Archangel  
Llanfilo, Saint Bilo
Llanfoist, Saint Fwyst
Llanfrothen, Saint Brothen see St Brothen's Church, Llanfrothen
Llanfrynach Saint Brynach
Llanfyllin, Saint Myllin
Llanfynydd, Mountain Church
Llanfyrnach, Saint Brynach
Llangadfan, Saint Cadfan 
Llangadog, Saint Cadoc
Llangadwaladr, Saint Cadwaladr
Llangadwaladr, Powys, Saint Cadwaladr
Llangaffo, Saint Caffo see St Caffo's Church, Llangaffo 
Llangain, Saint Cain
Llangammarch Wells, St Cadmarch
Llangain, St Cain
Llangan, St Canna
Llanganten, St Cannen
Llangasty Tal-y-Llyn St Gastyn
Llangathen, Saint Cathen
Llangattock-Vibon-Avel, St Cadoc (Cattwg)
Llangattock Lingoed, St Cadoc
Llangattock (Crickhowell), St Cadoc
Llangedwyn Saint Cedwyn see St Cedwyn's Church, Llangedwyn
Llangeinor, St Ceinwyr
Llangeinwen, Saint Ceinwen
Llangeitho, Saint Ceitho
Llangeler, Saint Celer
Llangelynnin, Saint Celynin
Llangelynnin, Gwynedd, Saint Celynin
Llangennech, Saint Cennych
Llangennith, Saint Cenydd
Llangenny St.Cenau or Saint Keyne
Llangian, Saint Cian
Llangiwg near Pontardawe, St Ciwg
Llangloffan, Saint Cloffan (fictitious)
Llanglydwen, St Clydwen
Llangollen, Saint Collen
Llangolman, Colmán of Dromore
Llangovan, Saint Govan
Llangrannog, Saint Caranog or Carantoc
Llanrhian, Saint Rhian
Llangristiolus Saint Cristiolus
Llangunllo, Saint Cynllo
Llangunnor, Saint Ceinwr 
Llangurig, Saint Curig
Llangwyfan, Aberffraw Saint Cwyfan see  St Cwyfan's Church, Llangwyfan
Llangwyfan, Denbighshire, Denbighshire, Saint Cwyfan
Llangwyfan, Aberffraw, Saint Cwyfan
Llangwnnadl, Saint Gwynhoedl
Llangwyryfon, Saint Ursula
Llangwyllog Saint Cwyllog
Llangybi (Llangybi, Monmouthshire, Llangybi, Gwynedd and Llangybi, Ceredigion) Saint Cybi (or Cuby) 
Llangyfelach, Saint Cyfelach
Llangyndeyrn, Saint Cyndeyrn
Llangynfelyn, Saint Cynfelyn
Llangynhafal, Saint Cynhafal
Llangynidr, St Cynidr
Llangynin, Saint Cynin
Llangynog, Saint Cynog 
Llangynog, Carmarthenshire St Cynog
Llangynwyd, Saint Cynwyd
Llangystennin, Mochdre, Conwy  St. Cystennin (Constantine)
Llangywer, Saint Cywair
Llanharan, Saint Aaron
Llanhennock, Saint Henwg
Llanhilleth, From Welsh `Llanheledd` 'Church of Saint Heledd`
, Saint Iestyn
Llaniestyn, Gwynedd, Saint Iestyn
Llanidloes, Saint Idloes
Llanigon,  Saint Eigon
Llanilar, Saint Ilar
Llanilid, St Ilid
Llanishen (Llanisien), Saint Isan
Llanishen, Monmouthshire, St Isan
Llanismel, anglicised as 'St Ishmaels', Pembrokeshire, Saint Ismael (Saint Isfael)
Llanismel, anglicised as 'St Ishmael', Carmarthenshire, Saint Ismael
Llanllawddog, Saint Llawddog
Llanllechid, Saint Llechid
Llanllibio, Saint Llibio
Llanllowell, Saint Llywel
Llanllwchaiarn, Saint Llwchaiarn see St Llwchaiarn's Church, Llanllwchaiarn
Llanllwchaiarn, Ceredigion
Llanllwni, St Llwni
Llanmadoc, Saint Madoc
Llanmartin, Saint Martin
Llanmihangel, Vale of Glamorgan, St Michael, the Archangel
Llannefyd, Conwy County Borough Saint Nefydd
Llannon, Saint Non
Llanon, Saint Non
Llanwnnog, Saint Gwynog
Llanpumsaint, five saints: Gwyn, Gwynno, Gwynoro, Ceithio and Celynin
Llanrhian, Saint Rhian
Llanrhidian, St Rhidian
Llanrhychwyn, Saint Rhychwyn
Llanrhyddlad, Saint Rhyddlad
Llanrhystud, St Rhystyd
Llanrwst, Saint Grwst
Llansadurnen, St Sadurnen
Llansadwrn, Anglesey, Saint Sadwrn  see St Sadwrn's Church, Llansadwrn
Llansadwrn St Sadwrn
Llansamlet, Saint Samlet
Llansanffraid Glan Conwy Brigid of Kildare (Saint Ffraid)
Llansannan, Saint Sannan
Llansannor, St Senwyr
Llansantffraed, (Talybont-on Usk) St Ffraid
Llansantffraid, Ceredigion, St Ffraed
Llansanffraid Cwmdauddwr St Fraid
Llansantffraid Glyn Ceiriog, St Fraid
Llansantffraed-in-Elwell, St Ffraed
Llansantffraed, Monmouthshire, St Brigid (Ffraid/Bride/Bhrid)
Llansantffraid-ym-Mechain, Saint Ffraid
Llansawel, Saint Sawell
Llansilin, Saint Silin
Llanspyddid, St Ysbyddyd
Llanstadwell,  St Tudwal
Llansteffan, Saint Stephen
Llanstephan, Powys, St Stephen (or Ystyffan)
Llanstinan, St Justinian
Llantilio Crossenny St Teilo
Llantilio Pertholey St Teilo
Llantood, The name of the hamlet is assumed to derive from the 5th century saint, Illtyd
Llantrisant, three saints: Illtud, Gwynno and Dyfodwg
Llantrisant, Anglesey, three saints: Afran, (possibly a variant of Afan) Ieuan, and Sana
Llantrisant, Monmouthshire, three saints: St Peter, St Paul and St John
Llantrithyd, of St Illtyd
Llantwit Major, Saint Illtud
Llantwit Fardre ('Llanilltud on the Prince's own farm'; from : [on the] 'land (or farm) of the prince'), Saint Illtud
Llantysilio, Saint Tysilio
Llanvaches, Saint Maches
Llanvair Discoed, St Mary
Llanvapley, St Mable see St Mapley's Church, Llanvapley
Llanvetherine, Saint Gwytherin
Llanvihangel Gobion, St Michael, the Archangel
Llanvihangel-Ystern-Llewern, St Michael, the Archangel
Llanwddyn, Saint Wddyn
Llanwenog, Saint Gwenog see St Gwenog's Church, Llanwenog
Llanwinio, Saint Gwinio/Gwynno
Llanwnnen, Saint Gwynin
Llanwrda, St Cwrdaf 
Llanwrin, Saint Gwrin
Llanwrthwl, Saint Gwrthwl
Llanwyddelan, Saint Wyddelan
Llanynghenedl, Saint Enghenedl see St Enghenedl's Church, Llanynghenedl
Llanyre, Saint Llyr

Place names with religious connections other than a saint
Llandaff, named after the River Taff
Llanddarog, uncertain; church dedicated to Saint Twrog
Llandow, derives from Llandhuw, meaning Church of God
Llandrindod, named after the Trinity
Llanfaes, 'church of the field' from  + , 'field'. (Originally dedicated to Saint Fagan)
Llanfarian after Capel Marian
Llangefni, named after the River Cefni. (Previously known as Llangyngar, after Saint Cyngar)
Llanllugan See Llanllugan Abbey
Llansaint possibly named after a holy well, Ffynnon Saint ('saint's well') 
Llansoy, after Tysoi, thought to have been a pupil of St. Dyfrig.
Llantarnam
Llanybydder,  "the church of the deaf ones"
Llanymynech (part) `Church of the Monks`

Place names without a religious connection

Bwlch-Llan, Ceredigion
Landimore from Mor- Sea
Llan, Powys
Llanaber
Llanaeron, after the River Aeron
Llanarmon-yn-Ial named after  St Germanus of Auxerre and a commote of Medieval Wales
Llanarth, Ceredigion, named for the River Arth whose outlet into Cardigan Bay is nearby
Llanarth, Monmouthshire, from earlier (recorded 12th century) form 'Llangarth', possibly meaning either "church on the ridge of the hill” or  “church with a garth (yard)"
Llanbister
Llanboidy uncertain
Llanbradach, name evolved from Nant Bradach
Llancarfan, name evolved from Nantcarfan
Llancayo
Llancoch (Radnorshire), 'red'
Llandarcy, named after William Knox D'Arcy
Llandenny
Llanddulas, named after the River Dulas
Llandinam,
Llandovery, a corruption of Llanymddyfri, in English: 'Church enclosure amidst the waters'
Llandynan
Llaneglwys, Brecknockshire – llan + eglwys, 'church'
Llanerch, Powys
Llanerchaeron, Ceredigion, mansion estate adjacent to River Aeron
Llanfaenor (Monmouthshire) see Llangattock-Vibon-Avel, 'manor'
Llanfair-yn-Neubwll , 'aeroplane', referring to nearby RAF Valley.
Llanfaredd, from the Fareth, a small stream.
Llanfechain
Llanfendigaid Estate
Llan Ffestiniog
Llanfor
Llanfynydd, Flintshire, 'mountain'
Llanfynydd
Llangadwaladr after King Cadwaladr
Llangefni, Anglesey, named from River Cefni
Llangernyw named after the area of Cernyw
Llangoed The village's placename means the 'religious enclosure in the wood' in the Welsh language.
Llangoedmor in Ceredigion, originally Llangoedmawr, 'great wood'
Llangors, 'marsh'
Llangwm, Conwy, 'valley' 
Llangwm, Pembrokeshire
Llangwm, Monmouthshire
Llanharry
Llanllwch
Llanllyfni, Gwynedd, llan on the River Llyfni 
Llanmaes
Llanmerewig
Llan-mill, Pembrokeshire
Llanmiloe named after Llanmiloe House
Llanmorlais, name evolved from Glan Morlais
Llannor 
Llannerch-y-medd 
Llanrhaeadr-yng-Nghinmeirch
Llanrhaeadr-ym-Mochnant, Montgomeryshire, llan + rhaeadr: '(waterfall) in the cantref of' Mochnant
Llanrhos, also known as Eglwys Rhos
Llanrhyddlad
Llanrug, (former name: "Llanfihangel-y-Rug")
Llanrumney, named after River Rhymney
Llanteg
Llanuwchllyn, Gwynedd, llan + uwch + llyn: llan 'above the lake'
Llanymawddwy, Gwynedd, from llan + yn + Mawddwy: llan 'in the district of Mawddwy'
Llanwern, Llanywern (Breconshire), 'church on the marshy ground'
Llanwnda, Gwynedd 
Llanwnda, Pembrokeshire, named after Garn Wnda burial chamber
Llanwrtyd, Llanwrtyd Wells Personal name `Gwrtyd`?
Llanycefn, 'cave'
Llanychaer, (English: 'church on the Aer', a tributary of the River Gwaun)
Llanycil
Llanynys, 'island'
Llanyrafon, 'river'
Llanystumdwy, Gwynedd, from llan + ystum + Dwy: llan on the meander of the river Dwy

Place names in counties bordering Wales
Lancaut, Gloucestershire
Llancillo, Herefordshire
Landican (Birkenhead, Merseyside), Saint Tegan
Llandinabo, Herefordshire
Llancloudy, Herefordshire
Llanfair, site of St Mary's church, near Clifford Castle in Clifford, Herefordshire, Wye Valley
Llanfair Waterdine, Shropshire
Llangarron, Herefordshire
Llangrove, Herefordshire
Llanrothal, Herefordshire
Llanveynoe, Herefordshire
Llanwarne, Herefordshire
Llanymynech (part), Shropshire
Llanyblodwel, Shropshire

Uncertain of origin
Llanbethery
Llancadle
Llancarfan
Llanhamlach
Llandawke
Llandeloy
Llandefalle
Llandevaud
Llanddowror
Llanfrechfa
Llanybri
Llanycrwys 
Llanwenarth
Llandevenny, Newport

Place names in Cornwall

Places named after saints
Lannahevran, St Keverne, Saint Achevran
Lannaled, St Germans, Saint Aled
Lannanta or Ewni Lananta, Lelant, Saint Anta
Lannbrobus, Probus, Saint Probus
Lanndege, Old Kea, Saint Kea
Lanndewydnek, Landewednack, Saint Gwynnek
Lanndhylyk, Landulph, Saint Deloc
Lanndoho, St Kew near Wadebridge, Saint Dochou, similar to the Welsh Llandochau
Lannentenin, St Anthony in Meneage, Saint Antonius
Lannewa, St Ewe, Saint Ewa
Lannfyek, Feock, Saint Feoc
Lanngostentin, Constantine, Saint Constantine
Lannhernow, Lanherne, Saint Hernow
Lanngenewyt, Langunnett, Saint Cyneuit
Lanngorrek or Lanngorrow, Crantock, Saint Goroc
Lannhydrek, Lanhydrock, Saint Hydrek
Lannjowan, Leyowne, Saint John
Lannkynhorn or Lanngenhorn, Linkinhorne, Saint Cynhoern
Lannlivri, Lanlivery, Saint Lyfri
Lannmoren or Lannvorenn, Lamorran, Saint Morenna or Saint Moren
Lannoweyn, Cubert, Saint Owein
Lannreydhek or Lannreydhow, Lanreath, Saint Reydhek or Saint Reydhow
Lannrigon, Laregan and Lariggan
Lannrihorn, Ruan Lanihorne, Saint Rihoern
Lannsalwys, Lansallos, Saint Salwys
Lannseles, Launcells, Saint Seles
Lannsiek, St Just in Roseland, Saint Siek
Lannstevan, Launceston, Saint Stephen
Lannsulyan, Luxulyan, Saint Sulyan
Lannudhno, St Erth, Saint Udhno
Lannunwal, Laninval
Lannust, St Just in Penwith, Saint Just
Lannvihal, St Michael Caerhays, Saint Michael
Lannvorek, Mevagissey, Saint Morec
Lannvowsedh, St Mawes, Saint Maudet
Lannwedhenek, Padstow, Saint Guethenoc
Lannwenek, Lewannick, Saint Gwenek
Lannwolesyk, Lellizzick, Saint Gwledic
Lannworon, Goran, Saint Goron
Lannystli, Gulval, Saint Ystli

Place names with religious connections other than a saint
Kellilann, Clann, enclosure grove
Lannbesow, Lambessow, birch tree enclosure
Lannbron, Lambourne, hill enclosure
Lanndreth, St Blazey, religious enclosure by a beach or ferry
Lanneves, Lanivet, sacred grove religious enclosure
Lanneyst, Laneast, unknown
Lanngordhow, Fowey,  religious enclosure of tribes
Lannmanagh, Lammana, monk's enclosure
Lannmanagh, Looe Island, monk's enclosure
Lannpenn, Lampen, head enclosure
Lannsans, Lezant, holy religious enclosure
Lannvab, Mabe, son's enclosure
Lannvyhan or Ladnvian, Laddenvean, small religious enclosure
Lannwydhek, Mylor, wooded religious enclosure
Seghlan, Sellan, dry enclosure

Place names without a religious connection
Landrevik, Landrivick, originally Hendrevik (little old farm)
Landu, Landue, originally Nansdu (black or dark valley)
Landu, Lanjew (Withiel), originally Lendu (black or dark strip field)
Landuwy, Lantewey, originally Nantduwey (valley of the river Dewey)
Lannestek, Lanescot, originally Lysnestek (Nestoc's court)
Langarth, Langarth, originally Lenangath (the cat's strip field)
Langover, Langore, originally Nansgover (stream valley)
Lanjergh, Lanjeth, originally Nansyergh (roebucks valley)
Lanjiogh, Lanjew (Kea), originally Nanskiogh (stream valley)
Lankarrow, Lancarrow, originally Nanskarrow (stag's valley)
Lanlegh, Lanteague, originally Nanslegh (rock slab valley)
Lanlowarn, Lanlawren, originally Nanslowarn (fox's valley)
Lanmelin, Lamellion, originally Nansmelin (mill valley)
Lanmelin, Lamellyn, originally Nansmelin (mill valley)
Lanmorek, Lamorick, originally Nansmorek (Moroc's valley)
Lanmornow, Lamorna, originally Nansmornow (valley of a stream called Morno)
Lannergh, Lanarth, woodland clearing 
Lannergh, Landrake, woodland clearing 
Lannergh, Lannarth, woodland clearing 
Lannergh, Lanner, woodland clearing 
Lannergh, Larrick, woodland clearing 
Lannergh, Larrick (South Petherwin), woodland clearing
Lannergh, Muchlarnick, woodland clearing 
Lansewigy, Lanseague, originally Nansewigy (hinds valley)
Lanteglos, Lanteglos-by-Camelford, originally Nanteglos (church valley)
Lanteglos, Lanteglos-by-Fowey, originally Nanteglos (church valley)
Lantlogh, Landlooe, originally Nantlogh (valley of the river Looe)
Lantollek, Lantallack, originally Nanstollek (hollowed valley)
Lantyvet, Lantivet, originally Nantyvet (cultivated valley)
Lantyeyn, Lantyan, originally Nantyeyn (cold valley)
Lanyeyn, Lanyon, originally Lynyeyn (cold pool)
Lanyeyn, Lanyon (Gwinear), named after the Lanyon family from Lynyeyn (cold pool)

Place names in areas bordering Cornwall
Landkey (near Barnstaple, Devon), Saint Kea

Place names in Brittany
Lampaul-Guimiliau, Saint Paul
Landerneau, Saint Ténénan 
Langolen, Saint Collen
Landeleau, Saint Teilo
Landoac, Saint Doac
Lanildut , Saint Illtud
Lannédern, Saint Edern
Landévennec, Winwaloe
Landivisiau, Saint Gwisiau
Landudal, Tudwal
Lanhouarneau, Saint Hervé
Landévant , Saint Tevant
Landudec , Saint Tadec
Landunvez , Sainte Tunvez
Langoëlan , Saint Gouelan
Languidic , Saint Cynedd 
Landéda, Saint Tédia or Saint Tydeu
Landujan, Saint Tudin (Tudwal)
Langast, Saint Gal
Langourla , Saint Gourlae
Langrolay-sur-Rance , Saint Gourlae
Languenan,  Saint Kenan
Langonnet ,  Saint Konoed (Saint Cynwyd)
Lanmodez, Saint Maudez
Landrévarzec , Saint Harzheg
Lanarvily, Saint Haeruili
Lanvénégen , Saint Menegean
Lanvollon , Saint Volon
Landaul , (Perhaps Saint Teilo)
Landébia , Saint Tebiav
Lannéanou , Saint Leanou
La Harmoye , Saint Harmoël
La Landec, Saint Deg
Landéhen , Saint Guéhen
La Méaugon, Saint Algon
Lancieux , Saint Séoc (or Sieu)
Langueux , Saint Guéthénoc
Lanhélin , Saint Helen
Laniscat , Saint Escat
Lanneuffret , Saint Gwévret
Saint-Urbain , Saint Urvan
Lannion 
Landebaëron  
La Malhoure
La Nouaye
Lanrigan, Saint Rigan
Lanrivoaré, Saint Riware
La Vraie-Croix
Lanfains, Lanfains' name comes from the Breton language « lann » (hermitage) and, it seems, from the Latin « fanum » (temple). Lanfains was situated at the border of the Gallo and Breton languages.
Langan, Ille-et-Vilaine
Langon
Languédias, Saint Catihern
Lanmérin , Saint Mérin (Sant Vilin in Breton)
Lannebert , Saint Eber
Lanvellec , Saint Maeleg
Lanvéoc , Saint Maeoc
Laurenan , Saint Ronan*

Place names in Cumbria
The Cumbric language was spoken in Cumbria and elsewhere in The Old North up until the Early Middle Ages and some place names in Cumbria and surrounding counties have a Brythonic origin.

 Ketland. The first element is possibly equivalent to Welsh coed, "forest, wood".
 Lambert Ladd. Compare Lampert below.
Lamplugh. The second element '-plugh' has been explained as equivalent to Welsh plwyf "parish", or blwch "bare".

The historic name Llan Lleenawc may have been in this region and named after either Laenauc, a father of Guallauc, or *Lennóc, a saint name.

Place-names in areas bordering Cumbria 
 Lampert, Northumberland, also spelt Lampart. The second element has been explained as an equivalent of Welsh perth, "hedge, thicket".

In addition, *landā-, the earlier Brittonic word ancestral to llan occurs in Vindolanda, the name of a Roman fort.

Place names in Scotland
The Gaelic form lann ("enclosure, churchyard") also occurs, and its existence in Pictland may represent adoption into Gaelic of the Pictish usage.

Places named after saints 
 Lhanbryde, Moray (Gaelic: Lann Brìghde). Saint Bride. Lamanbride in 1215; the modern Welsh-like spelling is probably a 19th-century innovation)
 Lumphanan, Aberdeenshire (Gaelic: Lann Fhìonain), Saint Fhìonain.
 Lumphinnans Fife. Its etymology is identical to Lumphinnans above, with which it shares a Gaelic name.

Places with other religious connections
 Landis, Kirkcudbrightshire. Uncertain; may be of Scots origin.
 Lincluden, Kirkcudbrightshire. The location of an abbey. The second part of the name refers to the nearby Cluden Water. The first part could also be lïnn, "pool". 
 Lindores, Fife (Gaelic: Lann Doras). An abbey is located here. The name may mean "church at the pass".
 Longannet, Fife (Gaelic: Lann na H-Annaide). Occupied by a now-decommissioned power station. The name probably meant "former church enclosure".

Places with no known religious connections
 Conland, Fife. Possibly meaning "dog-enclosure" (G conlann, W cwnllan) or "grouping of enclosures" (G cu-lann).
 Drumdratland, Fife. Exact etymology unclear, but the first element is likely druim, "a ridge".
 Falkland, Fife. The first element in the name is unclear.
 Lumquhat, Fife. The name may mean "enclosure of the wild-cats".
 Lynchat, Inverness-shire. Meaning "wildcat's enclosure".
 Pentland, Midlothian. The first element may be pen ("head", "top") or pant ("hollow").
 Pouterlampert, near Castleton, Scottish Borders. The -lampert part of the name may share an etymology with the aforementioned Lampart in Northumberland. The first part of the name is *polter, an obscure Brittonic suffix.

In fiction

The long running American soap opera One Life to Live is set in fictional Llanview, Pennsylvania, set just outside the city of Philadelphia. In the fictional universe of the soap, Llanview is the county seat for Llantano County. An important historical estate, Llanfair, is also set in Llanview.

See also
 Welsh placenames
 List of Celtic place names in Galicia

References

External links
BBC Wales: What's in a name: Llan
BBC Wales – What's in a Name: Religion and creed in place names

Welsh language
Welsh words and phrases
Welsh toponyms
Place name element etymologies
Geography of Wales
Wales-related lists
English suffixes
Prefixes